Apolinar is a Mexican fantasy drama film directed in 1971 by Julio Castillo and produced by Alejandro Jodorowsky and Robert Viskin. The film was shot on location in and around Atotonilco, San Miguel de Allende, Guanajuato, in Mexico. Art direction was by Octavio Ocampo.

This was the only film direction undertaken by Castillo, later notable as a theatrical director.

Although a release date of 1972 is often given, the film was never released publicly, although stills were circulated by Peña (later Castillo's wife) and Torner, the co-writers with Castillo.

Plot
Tancredo, a poor man, is in love with a rich girl, who does not return his feelings. One day when she is bathing in a river, a flood sweeps her away and Tancredo is unable to save her. Mad with grief, he steals the sun. The gods call Apolinar to restore light to the earth, but he is obstructed by the magician of darkness, until by means of a telescope he is able to send a bag of light to Tancredo, now grown old. Tancredo goes to the seashore and opens the bag of light as an offering to his beloved, whereupon the sun returns to the earth.

Cast
Macaria
Eduardo Garduño
Fernando Rosales
Aarón Hernán
José Luis Castañeda
Bertha Moss
Pilar Souza
Ofelia Medina
Enrique Rocha
Sergio Kleiner (as Sergio Klainer)
Octávio Galindo
Adrián Ramos
José Gálvez
Pancho Córdova
Tito Novaro
Luis Torner
Manuel Calvo (as Manolo Calvo)
Enrique del Castillo
María Clara Zurita
Humberto Wagner
Roberto Schlosser
Julia Marichal
Gabriela
Susan Berger
Abel Woolrich
Paco Ignacio Taibo I
Alfredo Wally Barrón
Consuelo Quezada

References

External links
 Consejo Nacional para la Cultura y las Artes website: Sistema de Información Cultural - Apolinar 
 Theiapolis Cinema: Apolinar
 

1970s Spanish-language films
1971 films
1970s fantasy drama films
Mexican fantasy drama films
1971 drama films
1970s Mexican films